The Trading with the Enemy Act 1939 (2 & 3 Geo 6 c 89) is an Act of the Parliament of the United Kingdom which makes it a criminal offence to conduct trade with the enemy in wartime, with a penalty of up to seven years' imprisonment. The bill passed rapidly through Parliament in just two days, from 3 to 5 September 1939, and the Act was passed on 5 September 1939, at the beginning of the Second World War. It is still in force.

See also
 Trading with the Enemy Act
 Trading with the Enemy Act 1914
 Daimler Co Ltd v Continental Tyre and Rubber Co (Great Britain) Ltd

References

External links

Hansard
 House of Lords 1st and 2nd readings 3 September 1939
 House of Commons 1st reading 3 September 1939
 House of Commons 2nd reading 4 September 1939
 House of Commons committee stage and 3rd reading 5 September 1939
 House of Lords 3rd reading 5 September 1939
 Royal assent reported in House of Lords 5 September 1939
 Royal assent reported in House of Commons 5 September 1939

United Kingdom Acts of Parliament 1939
English criminal law
United Kingdom in World War II
Emergency laws in the United Kingdom
World War II legislation